The Cheap Repository Tracts were a series of moral, religious and political tracts first published between 1795 and 1817. Only British first editions are listed here except where a new edition contains an amended text or a new title (in which case the amended titles are given a new entry).

The entries are grouped according to the series in which they were first issued, and then in the order given by Spinney (1939). The numbers in the first column are those allocated by Spinney (1–187) and running numbers thereafter. They do not necessarily reflect the order in which they were published.

"First-day tracts" (March–June 1795)

Hazard/Marshall series (July 1795 – February 1796)

John Marshall "official" series (March 1796 – November 1797)

John Marshall "unofficial" series (January 1798 – December 1799)

John Evans printed editions (December 1797 – October 1798)

"Spa Fields tracts", 1817

Notes

Sources

Political literature
Christian literature
Series of books